Fluxion is the second album by German metal band The Ocean, released in November 2004. It is the first part of a two-CD project that ended with Aeolian.
The album was re-released in 2009 with new vocal tracks by then-lead vocalist Mike Pilat.

Track listing

Personnel
The Ocean
 Torge Ließmann - drums
 Gerd Kornmann - percussion
 Robin Staps - guitar, percussion
 Jonathan Heine - bass
 Meta - lead vocals (2004 edition)
 Nico Webers - additional vocals (2004 edition)
 Mike Pilat - lead vocals (2009 edition)
Additional musicians
 Markus Gundall - backing vocals
 Thomas Herold - backing vocals
 Alex Roos - backing vocals
 Rebekka Mahnke - cello
 Demeter Braun - violin
 Tove Langhoff - clarinette
Production
Original version (2004):
Michael Schwabe -mastered
Alex Hornbach - mixing
Robin Staps - mixing
Alonso Urbanos - artwork
Robin Staps - artwork

Re-edition (2009):
Julien Fehlmann - remix, remaster
Martin Kvamme - artwork
Sven Kvamme - artwork

References

2004 albums
The Ocean (band) albums